Waltzing Matilda is a 1958 Australian cartoon short based on the song Waltzing Matilda which aired on the ABC.

It is a five-minute film produced from 4,500 drawings by Australian Rowl Greenhalgh and a team of 14 artists. Henry Krips arranged soundtrack music for the orchestra. It was first broadcast in December 1958 and repeated in July 1959 and January 1960.

References

External links
Copy of film at YouTube

Australian television plays
Australian animated short films
1958 animated films
1958 films
1950s Australian animated films